Villanyian age is a period of geologic time (3.4–1.8 Ma) within the Pliocene used more specifically with European Land Mammal Ages. It precedes the Ruscinian age and overlaps the early Piacenzian and Zanclean ages.

References

Piacenzian